This is a list of alumni notable in their own right of the University of the Philippines College of Law (U.P. College of Law), having obtained their LL.B. or Juris Doctor degree from the College, and their organizations while in the College. For a list of notable University of the Philippines graduates, see University of the Philippines people.

Government of the Philippines

Executive branch

Presidents

 Elpidio Quirino - Pan Xenia Fraternity
Manuel Roxas - UP Vanguard Fraternity
José P. Laurel - Upsilon Sigma Phi
 Ferdinand Marcos - Upsilon Sigma Phi

Vice Presidents

 Jejomar Binay - Alpha Phi Omega
Salvador Laurel - Upsilon Sigma Phi
 Arturo Tolentino - Upsilon Sigma Phi

Cabinet officials
Department of Public Works and Highways Secretary Simeon A. Datumanong (2001-2003, appointed as DoJ Secretary in 2003) Justice Secretary Simeon A. Datumanong (2003 - 2004 resigned to sun for Congress)

Joker Arroyo, 52, Executive Secretary (Aquino) - Upsilon Sigma Phi
Catalino Macaraig, Jr., 52, Executive Secretary (Aquino) - Upsilon Sigma Phi
Salvador Panelo 74, Chief Presidential Legal Counsel and Spokesperson (Duterte) - Sigma Rho
Simeon Datumanong, 59, Secretary of Justice (Arroyo) - Sigma Rho
Oscar Orbos, 76, Executive Secretary and DOTC Secretary (Aquino) - Alpha Phi Beta
Sabino B. Padilla Sr., 15, Secretary of Justice (1948–1949)
José E. Romero, 22, Secretary of Education (1959–1962; Garcia, Macapagal)
Gilbert Teodoro, 89, Secretary of National Defense (Arroyo) Also elected as Representative of Tarlac, 1998-2007
Perfecto Yasay, 72, Secretary of Foreign Affairs (2016–17; Duterte) Also served as Chair of Securities and Exchange Commission, 1995-2000)

Solicitors-General
Francisco Chavez, 71, (1986-1992) - Sigma Rho
Estelito Mendoza - Upsilon Sigma Phi
Querube Makalintal - Upsilon Sigma Phi
Juan Liwag - Upsilon Sigma Phi
Ricardo P. Galvez - Upsilon Sigma Phi
Romeo C. de la Cruz, 57, (1998)
Florin Hilbay, 99 (2014–2016)

Diplomats

Lauro L. Baja, Jr., 60, Ambassador to the United Nations (2003-2007) - Alpha Phi Beta
Rosario Gonzalez Manalo, 58, first woman to pass the Foreign Service Officers (FSO) Examination in 1959 - Delta Lambda Sigma
Rafael M. Salas, 53, first head of United Nations Population Fund - Sigma Rho, Pan Xenia
 Roberto S. Benedicto, Ambassador to Japan (1972-1978); First Class, Order of the Rising Sun (1977) - Upsilon Sigma Phi
Jaime Victor B. Ledda 89 - Ambassador to The Hague, Netherlands; current Organisation for the Prohibition of Chemical Weapons (OPCW) Asian Group Coordinator - Upsilon Sigma Phi
Carlos Sorreta,  91, current Ambassador to Russia and former Director-General of the Foreign Service Institute - Upsilon Sigma Phi 
José E. Romero, 22, first Philippine Ambassador to the United Kingdom (1949–1953)

Other Executive Branch officials
Darlene Berberabe-Lim, 99, CEO, Home Development Mutual Fund (2010-2017)
Mateo A. T. Caparas, 63''; Chairperson, [[Presidential Commission on Good Government]] (1988-1990)
[[Arnel Casanova]], 99, President, Bases Conversion and Development Authority  (2011-2016)
Jorge B. Vargas, 14, Presiding Officer of the Philippine Executive Commission during Japanese Occupation
Haydee Yorac, 63; Chairperson, Presidential Commission on Good Government (2001-2005) - Portia Sorority, Alpha Phi Omega
Terry Ridon, ‘11, Chairperson and Chief Executive Officer, Presidential Commission for the Urban Poor (2016-2017)
Medardo G. De Lemos, '83, National Bureau of Investigation (NBI) Director, 2022-present
Mehol Sadain, '86, Chairperson, National Commission on Muslim Filipinos (2012-2014) - Scintilla Juris

Judicial branch
Chief Justices of the Supreme Court
Ramon Aquino, 39, (1985-1986)
Felix Makasiar, 39, (1985)
Ricardo Paras, 13, (1951-1961)
Reynato Puno, 62, (2006–2010) - Alpha Phi Beta/International Order of DeMolay
Hilario Davide, Jr., 59, (1998 -2005) - Brotherhood of the Filipinos
Maria Lourdes Sereno, 84, (2012–2018) - Portia Sorority
César Bengzon, 19, (1961-1966) - Rizal Center
Teresita Leonardo-De Castro, 72, (2018) - Sigma Alpha, Portia Sorority
Marcelo Fernan, 52, (1988-1991) - Sigma Rho
Pedro Yap, 46, (1988) - Sigma Rho
Fred Ruiz Castro, 36, (1975-1979) - UP Vanguard Fraternity
José Yulo, 14, (1942-1944) UP Vanguard Fraternity
Enrique Fernando, 38, (1979-1985) - Upsilon Sigma Phi
Querube Makalintal, 33, (1973-1975) - Upsilon Sigma Phi

Associate Justices of the Supreme Court
Estanislao Fernandez, 33, (1973-1975)  - Upsilon Sigma Phi
Nestor Alampay 41 –  Upsilon Sigma Phi
Ramon Fernandez 40 –  Upsilon Sigma Phi
Vicente Ericta 39 – Upsilon Sigma Phi
Hermogenes Concepcion 38 –  Upsilon Sigma Phi
Emilio Gancayco 49 – Upsilon Sigma Phi
Jose Campos 50 – Upsilon Sigma Phi
Camilo Quiason 51 – Upsilon Sigma Phi
Florentino Feliciano 53 – Upsilon Sigma Phi
Josue Bellosillo 58 – Upsilon Sigma Phi
Alicia Austria-Martinez, 62, (2002-2009) - Alpha Phi Omega
Vicente Abad Santos, 40, (1979-1986)
Jesus Barrera, 21, (1959-1966)
Abdulwahid Bidin, 53, (1987-1997) - Alpha Phi Beta
Rosmari Carandang, 75, (2018–present) - Tau Gamma Sigma
Antonio Carpio, 75, (2001–present) - Sigma Rho
Conchita Carpio Morales, 68, (2004 - 2011)  - Portia Sorority; Phi Delta Alpha
Minita Chico-Nazario, 62, (2004-2010)
Irene Cortes, 48, (1987-1990)
Cancio Garcia, 61, (2004-2007)
Carolina Griño-Aquino, 50, (1988-1993) - Delta Lambda Sigma
Hugo Gutierrez, Jr., 52, (1982-1993) - Alpha Phi Beta
[[Marvic Leonen]], '''87, (2012–present)
Ameurfina Melencio-Herrera, 47, (1979-1992)  - Portia Sorority; Sigma Delta Phi
Vicente Mendoza, 57, (1994-2003) - Beta Sigma
Cecilia Muñoz-Palma, 37, (1973-1978) - Portia Sorority
Sabino Padilla Sr., '15 (1946-1964)
Teodoro Padilla, '51 (1987-1997) - Beta Sigma
Leonardo Quisumbing, 64, (1998-2009) - Alpha Phi Beta
Alexander Reyes, 14, (1948-1959)
J.B.L. Reyes, 22, (1954-1972)
Flerida Ruth Romero, 52, (1991-1999)
Abraham Sarmiento, 49, (1987-1991) - Alpha Phi Beta
Conrado Vasquez, 37, (1982-1983) 
Presbitero Velasco, Jr., 71, (2006–present) - Sigma Rho
James Vickers, 13, (1932-1936)
Consuelo Ynares-Santiago, 62, (1999-2010) - Alpha Phi Omega
Calixto Zaldivar, 28, (1964-1974)
Jhosep Lopez, 88, (2021–present) - Sigma Rho

Legislative branch

Senate Presidents 

 Aquilino Pimentel III '89
Jovito Salonga '46 - Sigma Rho (resigned)
 Marcelo Fernan '52 - Sigma Rho
 Edgardo Angara '58 - Sigma Rho
 Juan Ponce Enrile '53 - Sigma Rho, UP Vanguard Fraternity
 Franklin Drilon '69 - Sigma Rho
 Sotero Laurel '40 - Upsilon Sigma Phi
 Arturo Tolentino '34 - Upsilon Sigma Phi
 Ferdinand E. Marcos '39 - Upsilon Sigma Phi

Senators

 Francis Pangilinan, (2001–present) - Upsilon Sigma Phi
 Richard J. Gordon (2004–present) - Upsilon Sigma Phi
 Joker Arroyo (2001–present) - Upsilon Sigma Phi
 Mamintal A.J. Tamano (1987-1992) - Upsilon Sigma Phi
 Estanislao Fernandez, (1962-1965)- Upsilon Sigma Phi
 Sotero Laurel (1987-1992) - Upsilon Sigma Phi
 Juan R. Liwag (1963-1969) - Upsilon Sigma Phi
 Gerardo Roxas (1963-1972) - Upsilon Sigma Phi
 Domocao Alonto (1965-1961) - Upsilon Sigma Phi
Francis G. Escudero, (2007–2019) - Alpha Phi Beta
 Ambrosio Padilla, (1957-1973) - Alpha Phi Beta
 Pia Cayetano, (2004–present) - Delta Lambda Sigma
 Sonny Angara, (2013–present) - Sigma Rho
 Miriam Defensor Santiago, (1995-2001, 2004–2016) - UP Lady Vanguard
 Salipada Pendatun, (1946-1951, 1969-1972) - UP Vanguard Fraternity
 Justiniano Montano, (1949-1955)
 Rene Cayetano (1998-2003)
 Francisco Rodrigo, (1955-1972)
 José E. Romero, (1946)
 Jose Roy, (1962-1972)
 Lorenzo Sumulong, (1949-1972)
 Lorenzo Tañada, (1947-1972)

Speakers of the House of Representatives

 Querube Makalintal - Upsilon Sigma Phi
 José B. Laurel, Jr. - Upsilon Sigma Phi
 Nicanor Yñiguez - Upsilon Sigma Phi
 Eugenio Pérez
 Daniel Romualdez - Alpha Phi Omega
 Arnulfo Fuentebella

Representatives
Class 1959 House Deputy Speaker Simeon A. Datumanong Maguindanao Second District (1992-2001; 2004-2019)
Ferdinand Martin Romualdez, 92; House Majority Leader (2019–present); 1st District, Leyte (2007–present) - Upsilon Sigma Phi
Roman Romulo, 94; Lone District, Pasig (2007–present) - Upsilon Sigma Phi
Jesus Crispin Remulla, 87; 3rd District, Cavite (2004–present) - Upsilon Sigma Phi
Wenceslao Vinzons, 33; Lone District, Camarines Norte (1941-1942) - Upsilon Sigma Phi
Cyrille Abueg-Zaldivar, 03; Legislative districts of Palawan (1995-2004)
Bellaflor J. Angara-Castillo, 62; Lone District, Aurora (1995-2004)
Juan Edgardo "Sonny" M Angara, 00; Lone District, Aurora (2004–2013) - Sigma Rho
Kit Belmonte, 02; 6th District, Quezon City (2013–present) 
Neri Colmenares, 96; Bayan Muna (2010-2016)
Arthur Defensor, 63; 3rd District, Iloilo (2001–present) Sigma Rho
Matias Defensor Jr., 71; 3rd District, Quezon City (2004-2010) - Beta Sigma
Pio Duran, 23; 3rd District, Albay (1949-1961)
Constantino Jaraula, 60; Lone District, Cagayan de Oro City (1998-2007)
Edcel Lagman, 66; 1st District, Albay (1987-1998, 2004–present) - Alpha Phi Beta
Romulo Lumauig, 57; First elected Congressman, Ifugao (1969-1972) - Beta Sigma
Romero Quimbo, 96; 2nd District, Marikina (2010–present) - Alpha Sigma
Terry Ridon, 11; Kabataan Party List (2013-2016)
Rufus Rodriguez, 80; 2nd District, Cagayan de Oro City (2007–present)
José E. Romero, 22; 2nd District, Negros Oriental (1931–1941, 1945-1946)
Ron Salo, 03; KABAYAN Party List (2016–present)
Victor Sumulong, 73; 2nd District, Antipolo City (1998-2007) - Sigma Rho
Luis Villafuerte, 59; 2nd District, Camarines Sur (2004–present) - Sigma Rho
Liwayway Vinzons-Chato, 68; Lone District, Camarines Norte (2007–present)
Ronaldo Zamora, 69; Lone District, San Juan City (1987-1998, 2004–present)
Maria Salud Vivero - Parreno, 42; 2nd District, Leyte (1965 - 1969)

Heads of Constitutional Offices
Christian Monsod, 60'', [[Commission on Elections (Philippines)|COMELEC]] Chairperson (1991-1995) - [[Upsilon Sigma Phi]]
Bartolome C. Fernandez, Jr.; Commissioner, Commission on Audit - Upsilon Sigma Phi
Vicente Ericta - Ombudsman - Upsilon Sigma Phi
[[Romeo Brawner]], 59, COMELEC Acting Chairperson (2008)
Simeon Marcelo, 79, Ombudsman (2002-2005) - Sigma Rho
Conchita Carpio Morales, 68, Ombudsman (2011–present) - Portia Sorority
Purificacion Quisumbing, 64, Chairperson, Commission on Human Rights
Lucineto Tagle, 68,COMELEC Commissioner(2008-2015); Former Associate Justice, Court of Appeals - Beta Sigma
Ma. Rowena Amelia V. Guanzon, 84, COMELEC Commissioner (2015–present) - Delta Lambda Sigma
Mehol Sadain, '86, COMELEC Commissioner (2000-2006) - Scintilla Juris

Notable local government executives

Richard J. Gordon, '75; chairman of the Subic Bay Metropolitan Authority; Senator; Chairman, Philippine Red Cross - Upsilon Sigma Phi
Jejomar Binay, 67; Makati mayor (1986-1998, 2001-2010) - Alpha Phi Omega/International Order of DeMolay
Cesar Climaco, 41; Zamboanga City mayor
Carmen Planas, 40, first woman elected to a city council (Manila) - Sigma Delta Phi
Isidro Rodriguez, 38, former Rizal governor
Jesus Crispin Remulla, 88 former Cavite governor and incumbent Congressman - Upsilon Sigma Phi

 International Organizations 

 Jolly Bugarin, only Filipino elected as President, International Criminal Police Organization (Interpol) - Upsilon Sigma Phi
 Mateo A. T. Caparas, only Filipino elected as President of Rotary International - Upsilon Sigma Phi
 Florentino P. Feliciano, Chairman of the Appellate Body of the World Trade Organization - Upsilon Sigma Phi
 Raul Pangalangan, judge of the International Criminal Court - Alpha Sigma

Academe
Edgardo Carlo Lasam Vistan II - current Dean, UP College of Law - Upsilon Sigma Phi
Danilo Concepcion '84 – current President, University of the Philippines; Dean, UP College of Law; Commissioner, Securities and Exchange Commission; President, Gregorio Araneta University Foundation - Upsilon Sigma Phi
Joseph Emmanuelle Angeles '03 – President, Angeles University Foundation - Upsilon Sigma Phi
Carmelino Alvendia, Sr., 30; founder of Quezon City Academy, co-founder of MLQU - Upsilon Sigma Phi
Sotero Laurel '40 - President, Lyceum of Batangas; Chairman, Lyceum of the Philippines University - Upsilon Sigma Phi
Carmelino Alvendia, Sr., 30; founder of Quezon City Academy, co-founder of MLQU - Upsilon Sigma Phi
Conrado Benitez, 16; co-founder, Philippine Women's University - Upsilon Sigma Phi
Raul Pangalangan, 83 – International Criminal Court judge, law professor, newspaper columnist and former U.P. Law Dean - Alpha Sigma
Antonio La Viña, 89; former Dean of Ateneo School of Government, U.P. Law Professor
Katrina Legarda, 80; family law specialist; former Manila Times publisher; author; former television host
Raoul Victorino, 57; former dean, College of Law Philippine Christian University, Former Associate Justice, Sandiganbayan - Beta Sigma

Social activism and advocacy
Antonio Oposa, 82; environmental activist
Ahmad Domocao Alonto; King Faisal International Prize Awardee for Service to Islam - Upsilon Sigma Phi

Industry

Chito Salud, '85; Chairman and CEO, Philippine Basketball Association - Upsilon Sigma Phi
Jake Almeda Lopez, '52; general manager and Vice Chairman, ABS-CBN - Upsilon Sigma Phi
Antonio Quirino, 32; founder of (ABS) Alto Broadcasting System (precursor to ABS-CBN), first television station in the Philippines - Upsilon Sigma Phi
Eugenio Lopez, Sr., 23; founder of Chronicle Broadcasting Network and Manila Chronicle
Felipe Gozon, 62, Chairman and CEO, GMA Network
Loida Nicolas-Lewis, 68; CEO, TLC Beatrice
Don M. Ferry, '''57; former Vice Chairman, Development Bank of the Philippines; former Chairman, Board of Transportation (Now LTFRB) - Beta Sigma

Arts

Literature
Stevan Javellana, 48; novelist (Without Seeing the Dawn) - Sigma Rho
Linda Ty Casper, 55; novelist (The Peninsulares, DreamEden)

News and entertainment industry

Television
Jake Almeda Lopez, '52; general manager and Vice Chairman, ABS-CBN - Upsilon Sigma Phi
Danilo Concepcion 83 - UP President, DZMM announcer; Law Professor, U.P College of Law - Upsilon Sigma Phi
Zorayda Ruth Andam, '04; Binibining Pilipinas-Universe 2001; television host; commercial endorser
Anna Theresa Licaros 09 - Binibining Pilipinas-Universe 2007; commercial endorser - Portia Sorority
Jose Mari Velez '''70 - television newscaster with ABC and GMA - Scintilla Juris

Print journalism
Billy Balbastro, 62''; entertainment columnist - Sigma Rho
Daisy Catherine Mandap, '85, Print and Broadcast Journalist and Editor (Manila and HK) ; UPAA Distinguished Alumna in Public Service, 2014

Footnotes

References 
 
 
 
 
 
List of Graduates of the UP College of Law, 1999 Souvenir Program of the Silver Jubilarians
University of the Philippines Law Alumni Association, Certificate of Merit plaque presented to Oscar Araneta, 1988-12-12.

Law alumni

Philippines College of Law